Barbara Alexandra "Sandra" Reemer (17 October 1950 – 6 June 2017) was an Indo-Dutch singer and television presenter. She represented the Netherlands in the Eurovision Song Contest on three occasions, tying with Corry Brokken for most appearances representing the country.

In 1972, she sang the song "Als het om de liefde gaat" in a duet with Dries Holten (she was credited as "Sandra", he was credited as "Andres"); the duo came fourth. In 1976, this time credited under her real name, Reemer performed solo singing the song "The Party's Over", which reached ninth place. In 1979, she was credited as "Xandra" and sang the song "Colorado", which placed twelfth. She later returned to the contest to sing backing vocals (uncredited) for the Dutch entry in 1983, "Sing Me A Song", performed by Bernadette.

On Dutch television Reemer (co)hosted popular shows including Sterrenslag, Wedden, dat..? and Showmasters.

She died on 6 June 2017, following a long battle with breast cancer.

See also
Netherlands in the Eurovision Song Contest 1972
Netherlands in the Eurovision Song Contest 1976
Netherlands in the Eurovision Song Contest 1979

References

1950 births
2017 deaths
Dutch women singers
Indonesian emigrants to the Netherlands
Dutch people of Chinese descent
Eurovision Song Contest entrants for the Netherlands
Eurovision Song Contest entrants of 1972
Eurovision Song Contest entrants of 1976
Eurovision Song Contest entrants of 1979
People from Bandung
Indo people
Deaths from cancer in the Netherlands
Deaths from breast cancer
Nationaal Songfestival contestants
Spanish-language singers of the Netherlands